Gerhard Danelius (April 2, 1913 Berlin-Wilmersdorf – May 18, 1978 Berlin-Buch) was a German communist politician. During the Second World War, he was active in antifascist struggles.

He was the chairman of the Socialist Unity Party of West Berlin, from the first congress of the party in 1966 to his death in 1978.

References

1913 births
1978 deaths
Communist Party of Germany politicians
Socialist Unity Party of Germany politicians
Socialist Unity Party of West Berlin politicians
Politicians from Berlin
Communists in the German Resistance
Recipients of the Patriotic Order of Merit in silver